The 2020–21 Scottish Premiership was the eighth season of the Scottish Premiership, the highest division of Scottish football (the 124th edition overall of the top national league competition, not including one cancelled due to World War II). The fixtures were published on 6 July 2020, with the season beginning on 1 August, following Scottish Government approval due to the COVID-19 pandemic in Scotland. 

Twelve teams contested the league: Aberdeen, Celtic, Dundee United, Hamilton Academical, Hibernian, Kilmarnock, Livingston, Motherwell, Rangers, Ross County, St Johnstone and St Mirren. Celtic were the defending champions, seeking a record-breaking tenth successive title.

On 7 March, Rangers clinched the title for the 55th time & the 1st time since the new Premiership league format after Celtic drew 0–0 away to Dundee United with 6 games remaining. Rangers also completed an unbeaten league season in front of no fans during a pandemic lockdown on 15 May 2021 after a 4–0 win against Aberdeen, This was with 6 games to go, The earliest this 10 year old league has seen (even though it was under special circumstances).

Teams
The following teams changed division after the 2019–20 season.

Promoted from the Championship
Dundee United

Relegated to the Championship
Heart of Midlothian

Stadia and locations

Personnel and kits

Managerial changes

Format
In the initial phase of the season, the 12 teams play a round-robin tournament whereby each team plays each one of the other teams three times. After 33 games, the league splits into two sections of six teams, with each team playing each other in that section. The league attempts to balance the fixture list so that teams in the same section play each other twice at home and twice away, but sometimes this is impossible. A total of 228 matches were played, with 38 matches played by each team.

League summary

Effects of the COVID-19 pandemic
After the 12 Premiership clubs were given permission to restart full-contact training by the Scottish Government from 29 June 2020, it was announced that an Aberdeen player had tested positive for COVID-19 two days later. The identity of the player was not disclosed but the club said that he was asymptomatic and self-isolating.

Nine days prior to the start of the season on 1 August, it was reported on 23 July that seven members of St Mirren's coaching staff had tested positive. As a result, a pre-season friendly between St Mirren and St Johnstone on 25 July was cancelled and Hamilton Academical, who had played St Mirren in a friendly on 18 July, confirmed that all of their players and coaching staff had subsequently tested negative. The following day, St Mirren announced that after the seven positive tests were retested, only one came back as positive with the other six negative.

On the opening day of the season Rangers defeated Aberdeen 1–0 at Pittodrie Stadium and after the game, eight members of the Aberdeen squad went out to a pub in the city. Later in the week, the pub was linked to an outbreak of COVID-19 in Aberdeen which led to a lockdown of the city. Two of the group subsequently tested positive for COVID-19 and the eight players were put into self-isolation. Initially, the Scottish Government said Aberdeen's match against St Johnstone, scheduled for 8 August, wouldn't be affected by the lockdown of the city but the match was postponed after First Minister Nicola Sturgeon said she was "pretty furious" about the situation. Aberdeen manager Derek McInnes was critical of the group of players - namely Bruce Anderson, Craig Bryson, Sam Cosgrove, Michael Devlin, Jonny Hayes, Matty Kennedy, Dylan McGeouch and Scott McKenna - who apologised for a "huge error of judgement".

The following weekend, defending champions Celtic drew 1–1 with Kilmarnock at Rugby Park on 9 August. Defender Boli Bolingoli was in the Celtic match squad and came off the bench during the match, but was found to have travelled back from Spain a few days earlier – at that time, a 14-day quarantine was required for anyone travelling to Scotland from that country. Celtic manager Neil Lennon said Bolingoli "went rogue" and the club were unaware of his actions before it came to light on 10 August. Kilmarnock manager Alex Dyer revealed that Celtic had apologised for the situation. Bolingoli (who tested negative for the virus) was subsequently fined £480 by the police for his breach of quarantine rules.

First Minister Nicola Sturgeon warned Scottish football clubs, players and authorities that the breaches of COVID-19 protocols set up to allow football to resume in Scotland had resulted in her giving the game a "yellow card" and that further breaches could lead to a pause in the football season. Aberdeen and Celtic's matches against Hamilton Academical and St Mirren respectively on 12 August were postponed as a result of the two incidents, as well as the Celtic vs. Aberdeen match on 15 August.

The Scottish Football Association (SFA) and Scottish Professional Football League (SPFL) introduced new rules following the breaches of COVID-19 rules which meant Bolingoli and the "Aberdeen eight" were charged by both governing bodies. An SFA hearing was held on 28 August which resulted in a three-match ban with a further two-match ban suspended for Bolingoli. The "Aberdeen eight" were each given a three-match suspended ban. The suspended bans would be triggered if a player was again charged with "bringing the game into disrepute" before 28 February 2021.

Three fixtures (Kilmarnock v Motherwell, St Mirren v Motherwell and St Mirren v Hamilton) during the autumn were postponed after Kilmarnock and St Mirren told the SPFL that they could not fulfil them as scheduled due to COVID-19 outbreaks. The SPFL initially awarded 3–0 victories to their opponents; but that decision was overturned after an appeal to the Scottish Football Association.

League table

Positions by round
The table lists the positions of teams after each week of matches. To preserve chronological evolvements, any postponed matches are not included in the round at which they were originally scheduled, but added to the full round they were played immediately afterwards. For example, if a match is scheduled for round 13, but then postponed and played between rounds 16 and 17, it is added to the standings for round 16.

Results

Matches 1–22
Teams play each other twice, once at home and once away.

Matches 23–33
Teams play each other once, either home or away.

Matches 34–38
After 33 matches, the league splits into two sections of six teams i.e. the top six and the bottom six, with the teams playing every other team in their section once (either at home or away). The exact matches are determined by the position of the teams in the league table at the time of the split.

Top six

Bottom six

Season statistics

Scoring

Top scorers

Source:

Hat-tricks

Most assists

Source:

Clean sheets

Source:

Attendances
Games are mostly being played behind closed doors due to the COVID-19 pandemic. Limited attendance is allowed at some grounds with strict conditions under the Scottish Government Tier system, dependent on the club's geographical location.

Awards

Premiership play-offs
The quarter-finals were contested between the third and fourth placed teams in the Scottish Championship. The winners advanced to the semi-finals to face the second placed team in the Championship, and the winners of that tie advanced to the final to play-off against the 11th placed team in the Premiership, with the winners securing a place in the 2021–22 Scottish Premiership.

Quarter-final

First leg

Second leg

Semi-final

First leg

Second leg

Final

First leg

Second leg

Broadcasting

Live matches

UK and Ireland 
Sky Sports has exclusive rights to the Scottish Premiership regular league season and can show up to 48 matches, whilst also broadcasting the play-off final with BBC Scotland showing the quarter-final & semi-final. Due to the impact of the COVID-19 pandemic, clubs can stream matches (not broadcast on Sky) to fans on a pay-per-view or "virtual season ticket" basis, whilst capacities in stadia are limited due to social distancing restrictions.

United States 
Select Premiership matches, along with the matches in the promotion/relegation playoffs, are shown in the United States on ESPN+, as part of a deal that allows ESPN+ to broadcast matches from Scottish leagues.

Highlights 
From the start of this season, highlights are shown on both Saturdays and Sundays on BBC Scotland's flagship Sportscene programme. Sky Sports also show highlights.

Gaelic-language channel BBC Alba has rights to broadcast repeats in full of 38 Saturday 3pm matches "as live" at 5.30pm. 

The SPFL also uploads the goals from every Premiership match onto its YouTube channel - available from 6pm on a Sunday for UK and Ireland viewers and 10pm on a Saturday for those worldwide.

References

External links
Official website

Scottish Premiership seasons
1
1
Scot